The Journal of Applied Polymer Science is a peer-reviewed scientific journal covering  polymer science. The journal covers all applications of synthetic and renewably sourced polymers, including batteries and fuel cells, organic electronics, biomedical implants and drug delivery, coatings and packaging. It also covers composites, blends, elastomers, films and membranes, fibers, emulsions and latices, degradation of polymers, block co-polymers, hydrogels, foams, nanostructured polymers, as well as innovative synthesis and processing techniques. According to the Journal Citation Reports, the journal has a 2020 impact factor of 3.125.

References

External links

Publications established in 1959
Chemistry journals